The women's 100 metres hurdles event at the 2009 European Athletics U23 Championships was held in Kaunas, Lithuania, at S. Dariaus ir S. Girėno stadionas (Darius and Girėnas Stadium) on 17 and 18 July.

Medalists

Results

Final
18 July
Wind: -2.0 m/s

Semifinals
17 July
Qualified: first 3 in each heat and 2 best to the Final

Semifinal 1
Wind: 0.1 m/s

Semifinal 2
Wind: 0.3 m/s

Heats
17 July
Qualified: first 3 in each heat and 4 best to the Semifinals

Heat 1
Wind: -0.9 m/s

Heat 2
Wind: -0.9 m/s

Heat 3
Wind: 0.0 m/s

Heat 4
Wind: -0.3 m/s

Participation
According to an unofficial count, 31 athletes from 17 countries participated in the event.

 (1)
 (2)
 (1)
 (1)
 (1)
 (2)
 (2)
 (3)
 (3)
 (1)
 (3)
 (1)
 (3)
 (1)
 (2)
 (3)
 (1)

References

100 metres hurdles
Sprint hurdles at the European Athletics U23 Championships